Gospodari Na Efira (Lords of the Air) was the highest rated and longest running original daily comedy TV show in Bulgaria, which aired for 15 years from 2003 to 2018. The show was hosted by two presenters and together with the "Adrenaline girls", they rotate every three to four months. Some of the most beloved Bulgarian comedians have hosted the show. Apart from showing TV blunders, the show has developed a strong satire profile of the program, which is based on serious political and social issues within Bulgarian society.

Awards 
The show gives awards to people. These are: White swallow (Byala Lyastovica), which is given for good behaviour/actions and the Golden skunk (Zlaten skunks), which is given for bad actions.

Blocks and serials 
 I watch and don't believe my ears (Gledam i ne vyarvam na ushite si)
 Popolina VOX
 Fast And Furious... waggons (Barzi i yarostni... karuci)
 Bai Brother
 IzSporten svyat (IzSport world) - a show for sport bloopers.
 The Great Analyzer (Velikiyat Analizator)

See also
 Nova Television (Bulgaria)

References

External links
 Official Facebook page

Bulgarian television series
2003 Bulgarian television series debuts
2000s Bulgarian television series
2010s Bulgarian television series
Nova (Bulgarian TV channel) original programming